Velinga is a village in the North Goa sub-district (or taluka) of Ponda. It lies in the centre of Goa, in a setting amidst greenery and temples.

Location code, size, population 

It features under the location code number of 626854 in the official Indian Census of 2011. According to the Census details, Velinga has an area of 315.00 hectares, and a total number of 444 households comprising 1,921 persons (including 1,001 males and 920 females). Its under-six population is made up of 145 children, including 79 boys and 66 girls.

References

Villages in North Goa district